Atlantic Bank Group, commonly known by its French name Groupe Banque Atlantique, is a West African financial services conglomerate, headquartered in Lome, Togo. The Group consisting of banks and other financial services companies in Cote d'Ivoire, Benin, Niger, Burkina Faso, Mali, Togo, Senegal and Cameroon.

Overview
The Group is a large financial services provider in West Africa and Central Africa, with emphasis on retail banking, but offering a full range of financial products. The group maintains in excess of 150 branches in the 8 countries that it serves. The Group's shareholder's equity is in excess of US$122 million, as of October 2010.

History
The first bank that the group established was Atlantic Bank Cote d'Ivoire (Banque Atlantique Cote d'Ivoire) (BACI), which was founded in 1978. In 1997, the Group acquired the assets of Barclays Bank in Cote d'Ivoire, keeping the new acquisition separate, but renaming it COBACI. In 2001, the Group created a joint stock with the symbol SGI. In 2005, SGI became Atlantic Financial Group, the holding company of the Atlantic Bank Group. In 2004, a new subsidiary under the name GIE was established to handle the Group's computing and information technology needs. In 2007, GIE rebranded as Atlantic Technology SA.

Starting in 2006, the Group started a regional expansion drive by the opening of Atlantic Bank Benin that year. The next year, Atlantic Bank Niger, Atlantic Bank Burkina Faso, Atlantic Bank Mali and Atlantic Bank Togo were established. Since then Atlantic Bank Senegal (2007) and Atlantic Bank Cameroon (2009) were established. Also in 2009, COBACI was merged with Atlantic Bank Cote d'Ivoire (BACI).

Group members
The holding company for the group is Atlantic Financial Group, based in Lome, Togo. The member companies of the Atlantic Bank Group include the following:

 Atlantic Bank Cote d'Ivoire - Abidjan, Cote d'Ivoire 
 Atlantic Bank Benin - Cotonou, Benin 
 Atlantic Bank Niger - Niamey, Niger 
 Atlantic Bank Burkina Faso - Ouagadougou, Burkina Faso 
 Atlantic Bank Mali - Bamako, Mali  
 Atlantic Bank Togo - Lome, Togo  
 
 Atlantic Bank Senegal - Dakar, Senegal 
 Atlantic Bank Cameroon - Douala, Cameroon 
 Atlantic Technology SA - Lome, Togo 
 Atlantic Finance - Lome, Togo  - A management and financial intermediation company
 Cash Money Worldwide - Lome, Togo  - A funds transfer company
 Atlantic Bank France - Paris, France  - The Group maintains a representative office in Paris, France.

See also

 List of banks in Togo
 List of banks in Africa
 Central Bank of West African States
 Central Bank of Central African States
 Economy of Togo

References

External links
 Website of Atlantic Bank Group (French)
 Website of Atlantic Bank Group (English)

 Banks established in 1978
Banks of Togo
Companies of Togo
Economy of Togo
1978 establishments in Ivory Coast
Lomé